The 2015 NCAA Division II football season, part of college football in the United States  organized by the National Collegiate Athletic Association at the Division II level, began on September 4, 2015 and ended with the NCAA Division II Football Championship on December 19, 2015 at Children's Mercy Park in Kansas City, Kansas.  Northwest Missouri State won their second national title in three seasons and fifth overall.

Conference and program changes

Northwestern Oklahoma State and Virginia–Wise completed their transitions to Division II and became eligible for the postseason.

Conference standings

Super Region 1

Super Region 2

Super Region 3

Super Region 4

Postseason

The 2015 NCAA Division II Football Championship Postseason involved 28 schools playing in a single-elimination tournament to determine the national champion of men's NCAA Division II college football. Miles College, the SIAC champion, was not eligible to postseason due to its participation to the 2015 Turkey Day Classic against Alabama State (FCS).

Playoff bracket

* Home team    † Overtime    Winner

See also
2015 NCAA Division I FBS football season
2015 NCAA Division I FCS football season
2015 NCAA Division III football season
2015 NAIA football season

References